De Hantumermolen is a smock mill in Hantum, Friesland, Netherlands which was built in 1880. The mill has been restored to working order. It is listed as a Rijksmonument, number 38619.

History

De Hantumermolen was built in 1880 by millwright G R van Wierum of Janum. It was built for a group of five owners with the purpose of draining the  Huntumerleeg. Circa 1932, the mill was fitted with four Patent sails. The mill was working until 1957 when a stock broke. The mill was then replaced by a pumping station powered by an electric motor. Restorations were undertaken in 1978 and 1994. The Patent sails were replaced with Common sails when the mill was restored in 1978. A further restoration was undertaken in 1998.

Description

De Hantumermolen is a smock mill on a single-storey brick base. The mill is winded by tailpole and winch. The smock and cap are thatched. The windshaft also carries the brake wheel which has 63 cogs. This drives the wallower (32 cogs) at  the top of the upright shaft. At the bottom of the upright shaft, the crown wheel, which has 43 cogs drives a gearwheel with 44 cogs on the axle of the Archimedes' screw. The axle of the Archimedes' screw is  diameter. It is inclined at 20° and each revolution of the screw lifts  of water.

Public access
De Hantumermolen is open by appointment or whenever the mill is working.

References

Windmills in Friesland
Windmills completed in 1880
Smock mills in the Netherlands
Windpumps in the Netherlands
Rijksmonuments in Friesland
Octagonal buildings in the Netherlands